Kandeh Sara (also Romanized as Kandeh Sarā; also known as Kendah Sar) is a village in Tula Rud Rural District, in the Central District of Talesh County, Gilan Province, Iran. At the 2006 census, its population was 323, in 63 families.

References 

Populated places in Talesh County